The Barwana massacre was committed by unknown Shia militia as a revenge for ISIS atrocities. It allegedly involved the sectarian execution-style killing of over 70 unarmed boys and men in the small Sunni village of Barwana, which is just west of Muqdadiyah, Iraq.

However, security officials disputed the accounts, with some saying that ISIS militants were responsible and others that they were fabricated by ISIS supporters.

Attack
The attack allegedly occurred on 28 January 2015, within the context of the military intervention against the Islamic State of Iraq and the Levant. The victims were refugees who had fled the previous ISIS advance in the region. Thirty-five other males were missing, or suspected of being detained.

According to Sunni witnesses, the security forces broke down doors and rounded up men in house-to-house searches, with the village chief saying, "They fooled me – they told me this would be a check of the names of displaced families."

Aftermath
Later, reporters seeking to visit the village, to gain information, were denied access.

The massacre is being investigated by Human Rights Watch.

Reactions
Iraqi military officials dismissed the massacre reports as a fabrication. According to the Saudi owned Asharq Al-Awsat, despite “similar instances” of Shia militias “committing sectarian atrocities.”

The attack was condemned by the Sunni-Salafi Association of Muslim Scholars as a "sectarian crime that clearly shows how much those militias characterized by lack of ethics to a limit that they have killed unarmed civilians in front of their families and relatives in a massacre of no less heinous than the previous ones committed by the governments of occupation and associated militias."

See also
Musab bin Umair mosque massacre

References

2015 murders in Iraq
January 2015 events in Iraq
January 2015 crimes in Asia
21st-century mass murder in Iraq
Terrorist incidents in Iraq in 2015
Massacres in Iraq
Massacres in 2015
Massacres of men
Incidents of violence against boys
Diyala Governorate
Mass murder in 2015
Religiously motivated violence in Iraq
Anti-Sunni attacks and incidents
Violence against men in Asia